Howard Fuller (born 31 July 1992 in Worcester Park, Surrey) is a British auto racing driver. He currently drives in the British Touring Car Championship for RCIB Insurance Racing.

Racing career

Early career
Fuller started out his racing career in kart racing, with his key result being a win at the Winter Festival at Sandown Park, which is run by Daytona Motorsport, in 2002.

Volkswagen Racing Cup
Fuller first entered the Volkswagen Racing Cup in 2010 at Rockingham, winning in his second race in the category by a four–second margin. He went on to race in the following round of the championship at Silverstone where he retired with gearbox problems.

British Touring Car Championship

Team HARD. (2012–2017)

Fuller joined the British Touring Car Championship grid for the Rockingham round of the 2012 season, replacing Robb Holland in the Team HARD. Honda Civic. He finished 14th in his first race, bettering this with a 12th place finish in the wet conditions of race two. He finished race one and two at Silverstone two weeks later 11th. Aaron Williamson took over the car for the final event of the season at Brands Hatch, meaning Fuller finished the season 24th in the drivers' championship.

Fuller originally planned to stay in the BTCC for the 2013 season, driving a Team HARD. Volkswagen CC. Although entered for the full season, he did not make his first race appearance until Rockingham where he drove a Vauxhall Insignia.

He was due to return to the BTCC in 2020, again with Team HARD but this time in the team's Volkswagen CC, as a replacement for Mike Bushell. However, the start of the season was delayed until August due to the outbreak of COVID-19, by which time he was replaced by Ollie Brown.

TCR UK

SWR Racing (2018-) 

Fuller joined Sean Walkinshaw Racing (SWR) in 2018 to pilot their Honda Civic Type R in the inaugural TCR UK series (www.tcruk.co.uk). Fuller qualified 3rd at Silverstone and finished in 4th and 5th places in the two races that weekend.

Racing record

Complete British Touring Car Championship results
(key) (Races in bold indicate pole position – 1 point awarded in first race) (Races in italics indicate fastest lap – 1 point awarded all races) (* signifies that driver lead race for at least one lap – 1 point given)

References

External links
Official website

1992 births
British Touring Car Championship drivers
Living people
Formula Renault BARC drivers